The ninth season of the series Show Me the Money (known as Show Me the Money 9 or SMTM9) premiered on October 16, 2020, and ended on December 18, 2020. It was broadcast every Friday at 23:00 (KST) on Mnet. The season returned to four producing teams, after having featured only two in the previous season. Dynamic Duo & Bewhy, Paloalto & Code Kunst, Zion.T & Giriboy, and Justhis & GroovyRoom formed the producing teams for the season.

The season saw approximately 23,000 applicants, the most in the show's history. However, fewer contestants were able to move on from the Rapper Selection Round compared to previous seasons, due to safety restrictions related to the COVID-19 pandemic.

The winner of the season was Lil Boi, with Team Zion.T x Giriboy as the winning producer team. He won ₩100,000,000 in cash, a sports car, and a one-year project label for his music activities, totaling to ₩500,000,000. Producer Giriboy also became the first 3-time winning producer of the show, having previously won in seasons 777 and 8.

Judges 
Team GroovyRoom x Justhis (also known as Team Guljeot)
GroovyRoom: Producer duo composed of Park Gyu-jung and Lee Hwi-min, currently signed under H1ghr Music, who previously participated as mentors/producers for seasons 2 and 3 of High School Rapper.
Justhis: rapper under Indigo Music.

Team Code Kunst x Paloalto (also known as Team CoPal)
 Paloalto: Founder, rapper and former CEO of Hi-Lite Records, who in season 4 was a judge/producer for Team ZiPal and in season 777 for Team CodePalo.
 Code Kunst: Music producer signed under AOMG, formerly signed under the defunct HIGHGRND, who in season 777 was a judge/producer for Team CodePalo.

Team Dynamic Duo x Bewhy (also known as Team DyWhy)
 Choiza and Gaeko: Co-founders of Amoeba Culture who comprise the hip-hop group Dynamic Duo, and were judges/producers in season 6.
 Bewhy: Rapper and producer, currently signed under his own label Dejavu Group, who participated in season 4 and became the show's champion in season 5 as a member of Team AOMG. He was a winning judge/producer in season 8, with the BGM-v Crew.

Team Zion.T x Giriboy (also known as Team Jagi)
 Zion.T: Singer and producer under The Black Label and member of VV:D crew, who was a judge/producer in season 5 with Team YG.
 Giriboy: Rapper, songwriter and record producer signed under Just Music and WEDAPLUGG Records. He was a season 3 contestant under Team YDG, and a winning judge/producer in seasons 777 and 8 for Team Just Music and BGM-v crew respectively.

Teams
After the 60 Seconds Team Trials, contestants who passed chose a producer team to join. There were ten members per producer team. Producer teams then selected contestants, if their team did not have ten members by the end of the 60 Second Team Trials:

Team GroovyRoom x Justhis:
Mushvenom: Independent rapper, also known as TRICKER, who was in seasons 2 and 6, and 8, and released TFT Mobile’s commercial jingle “Dududunga”.
Khundi Panda: Signed under Dejavu Group.
Mirani: Rookie rapper and member of VAT crew with fellow Team Member Munchman, initially eliminated during the 60 Seconds Team Trials but later revived to join the team. Later signed with GroovyRoom's newly founded label AREA. 
Munchman: Member of rap and dance group MostBadassAsian (MBA crew) under Stoneship and VAT crew with fellow Team Member Mirani. Previously participated in season 8, in which he gained popularity after his elimination in that season's rapper evaluation round for performing his soon-to-be hit song "DDK".
Kidd King: Member of Clarity Crew who previously participated in season 777, and in season 5 under his real name Baek Min-hyuk.
Owen: See §Controversies.
D.Ark: Season 777 contestant, as member of Team Illionaire Ambition. After his elimination from the show, he eventually signed under Psy's P Nation record label.
Yenjamin: Signed under Brand New Music and leader of KIFF Clan. Previously participated in the second season of High School Rapper. 
Blase: Previously participated in season 8 as a preliminary member of BGM-v crew. Formerly known as Bla$e Kid.
Kim Gyu-ha: Also known by his rapper name Reidaneon. He later participated in the fourth season of High School Rapper.

Team Code Kunst x Paloalto:
Swings: Rapper and former CEO of Just Music, Indigo Music and WEDAPLUGG Records, who participated as a contestant in season 2 under Team D.O., in season 3 as a producer/judge, as the winning judge/producer for season 777, and in season 8 as a judge/producer. His participation this season was full of controversy due to his reputation as a well-respected rapper, his way of judging contestants dating back from season 777 and 8, and netizens believing that he won't pass the rapper evaluation round.
Layone: Signed under OUTLIVE records. Previously participated in season 6 and 8. He initially received an all fail in the 60 Seconds Team Trials, and was later revived to join the team. 
Mckdaddy: Member of VAGABONDS Tribe, signed under Grandline Entertainment, who was in seasons 777 and 8.
Khakii: Rookie rapper signed under WAVY Seoul. 
Killagramz: Rapper and current radio show host in TBS and Arirang Radio, currently signed with K-Tune Collective, who was in seasons 5 and 6.
Juvie Train: Member of The Movement and Buga Kingz crews, as well as project team Original Taste (OT).
Ahn Byung-woong: Rapper signed under WAVY Seoul. Previously participated season 8 as a member of BGM-v crew in which was given the nickname "Lil Lil Boi".
Jambino: Member of COZY CAVE crew.
365lit: Member of UnderSeongsuBridge (USB) crew, brother of fellow contestant and USB crew member Jupiter.
viceversa: Independent rapper who participated in seasons 777 and 8, who was initially eliminated in the 60 Seconds Team Trials, and later revived to join the team.

Team Dynamic Duo x Bewhy:
Untell: Participant in season 8 as a preliminary member of BGM-v Crew who was initially eliminated in the 60 Seconds Team Trials, and later revived to join the team. Also participated in the third season of High School Rapper under his real name Oh Dong-hwan.
Kaogaii: One-half of rap duo HOFGANG, signed under LBNC (formerly known as Lay Back Records).
Heo Sung-hyun: Member of XALION crew with team member Kim Mono, who was in season 8, also known by his stage name ROSE DE PENNY. 
dsel: Member of FROST-30 crew, signed under LBNC. 
Chamane: Member of FRIEMILLI (FRML) crew who was in season 3.
Kim Mono: Member of Innovor (IV) and XALION crews.
Rohann: Member and leader of KIFF Clan, signed under Vismajor Company (VMC), who was in season 2 of High School Rapper (under the name Bae Yeon-seo).
Benzamin: Rapper signed under Primary’s recently established record label PAKTORY COMPANY.
Greengrim: Rapper signed under INTERPARK records, who was initially eliminated in the 60 Seconds Team Trials, and later revived to join the team.

Team Zion.T. x Giriboy:
Lil Boi: Rapper under his own label Halftime Records, one half of the rap duo Geeks, and member of the Buckwilds crew, who was in season 4.
Wonstein: Rapper and singer signed under Mommy Son's label Beautiful Noise, who was in seasons 4, 777 and 8. 
Skyminhyuk: Member of My My Life crew, also known as SKY. Signed with Grandline Entertainment mid-season.
Chillin Homie:  Member of Naughty4Life (NFL) crew, signed under Mine Field, who was in season 777 and 8.
Cho Soon-young: Member of HASHTAG crew who won MNET's hip-hop talent search My Major is HipHop, who is also known by his rapper name SYCHO.
Lee Gi-wook: Member of 100 mwg crew, also by his rapper name xscapeway or XS.  
kitsyojii: One-half of rap duo HOFGANG, signed under LBNC.
Mac Kidd: Signed under BASECREAM. 
noahjooda: Independent rapper.
Park Shin-wook: Previous participant in My Major is HipHop, also known by his rapper name HydroC.

Rounds

Round one: Rapper Selection Round 
After sending in their audition clips, those selected by the production crew attended the Rapper Selection Round; as a safety precaution from the COVID-19 pandemic, the contestants were divided into groups of thirty with one producer, (with the exception of Dynamic Duo and GroovyRoom), assigned to judge them individually. Each contestant performed a short a cappella rap in front of the producer and other contestants. The producer(s) then provided an in-depth evaluation of the contestant, and determined if they advanced to the next round. Unlike previous seasons, where the producer typically handed the SMTM neck chain to the contestant, contestants who received a pass simply took a neck chain hanging on a nearby rack. About 122 contestants would advance to the next round.

Notable Rappers from the Rapper Selection Round

Round two: Producer Performances and 60 Second Team Trials
The second round began with the Producer Performances, in which the producers performed in front of the contestants to convince the contestants to join their team. The performances were later used to pick which producer team they would face during the Team Diss Round, based on the contestants’ votes.

Previously known as the One Minute Rap Round, the 60 Second Team Trials allowed each contestant one minute to rap in front of all judges. At least one team of judges were required to pass the contestant in order to proceed with the team selection process. However, the producer team(s) could subsequently give a "FAIL" to the contestant after the performance if they thought that the contestant was not qualified to join their team. In this case, the contestant would then choose a different producer team that they wanted to join. If the contestant received an "ALL FAIL" from either the first or second judging, they were eliminated from the show. Only 40 out of the 122 remaining contestants would advance to the next round, with 10 contestants on each producer team. A "revival round" for 8 eliminated contestants was held for those producer teams that did not have a full 10-member team.

Producer Performances

- Indicates new song performed for the first time in the show, which was to be part of the season's discography.

Notable rappers at the 60 Second Team Trials

Selected rappers in the Revival Round

 Received a "PASS" or "ALL PASS" from the producer team(s)
 Received a "FAIL" from producer team(s). If the contestant received an "ALL FAIL", they were eliminated from the show
 Initially received a "PASS" from the producer team(s) but was given a "FAIL" after the producer team(s) decided not to pick the contestant for their team. If all producer teams decided to give a "PASS/FALL", the contestant was eliminated from the show

Round three (first part): Leader Selection Cypher
Before this round, the 40 remaining contestants each had a sticker pasted on them, based on the number passes each had obtained during the performance portion of the 60 Seconds Team Trials. Contestants with an "all pass" had a "Top" sticker, those with 2 or 3 passes had a "Middle" sticker, those with 1 pass had a "Bottom" sticker, and those that were revived from the Revival Round had a "Brink of Elimination" sticker.

All members of each producer team participated in a rap cypher, in which contestants performed freestyle raps based on the beat they wanted to do it with. At the end of this round, each producer team chose one contestant to be eliminated from the show, and selected their three best performers to serve as group leaders for the next round.

Round three (second part): Triple Crew Battle
The three crew leaders from each producer team each recruited two team members to form crews and compete in a Triple Crew battle. Each crew chose a beat or song from the producer team that they performed in front of the producer teams. The producers then ranked the groups based on their performances. The crew with the best performance had all three contestants advance to the next round, while the second-placed crew had one contestant eliminated, and the third-placed crew had two contestants eliminated.

 Indicates first-placed crew with all members advancing to the next round
 Indicates second-placed crew with only two members advancing to the next round
 Indicates third-placed crew with only one member advancing to the next round
 Indicates the eliminated contestant(s)

Round four: Soundtrack Battle
This round was previously known as the Crew Song Mission. Members of each producer team split into two crews – with the first placed crew from the previous round performing together – while the remaining members of the second and third placed crews formed a new group and performed together. The producer teams then picked new crew leaders based on their performances in the last round. Prior to this round, the producer teams held team meetings in which the producers introduced the beat they would use this round and would be performed in front of the Producer Teams. At the end of each group performance, each producer team eliminated two contestants from the losing crew of each producer team, while the members of the first placed crew advanced to the next round. The remaining crew members had their songs officially released as part of the season's official discography.

 Indicates the winning team, with all group members advancing to the next round, and their song included in the season's official discography 
 Indicates the losing team, with only one member of their team advancing to the next round and joining the winning crew in the season's official discography.

 Indicates the eliminated contestant(s)

Round five: Team Diss Battle
The winning producer team from the Producer Performances stages (Dynamic Duo x Bewhy) could choose their opposing team for this round. Due to the COVID-19 pandemic, only the eliminated contestants from previous rounds were available to serve as the audience and voters for this round. Each member of the audience voted for only 1 producer team after each rap battle. The losing producer team had its producers choose 1 contestant to eliminate, while the winning producer team had all members advance to the next round.

 Indicates the winning team, with all contestants advancing to the next round.
 Indicates the winning contestant/s.
 Eliminated from the show.

Round six: first live performances
Following the results of the Team Diss Battles, winning teams competed against each other and losing teams competed against each other at the live performances. Due to the COVID-19 pandemic, the show's producers held an open online application prior to this round, in which they selected a limited number of people, in addition to previously eliminated rappers, to serve as live audience members and voters for this round. All 4 producer teams held the mic selection for two of their own contestants to determine who would perform at the live stage; one contestant from each producer team would be eliminated. There were two rounds in the voting process. The first round involved voting on each of the two stages in one round; after the first round of voting was over, the second round of voting occurred, in which the live audience could only vote for one contestant. All of the contestants' performance money earnings were then accumulated to their respective producer teams at the end of the round. The winning producer team in each team matchup had its members advance to the semi-final round, while the losing producer team eliminated one more contestant.

 Indicates the winning performance, which advanced to the semi-final round.
 Eliminated from the show through mic selection prior to this round.

 Indicates the winning producer team, all of whose contestants advanced to the semi-final round.
 Indicates the losing producer team, which was required to eliminate one contestant at the end of the round.

Round Seven: semi-final performances
The top 8 contestants were paired up for the semi-final round. At the end of the first live performances, MC Kim Jin-pyo presented eight cards with each card representing one contestant. From there, he selected four cards that had bonuses in them, indicating that the contestant called in would have a chance to pick his/her opponent for this round. Due to the COVID-19 pandemic, like with the previous round, the show's producers held an open online application prior to this round in which they selected a limited number of people, in addition to previously eliminated rappers, to serve as live audience members and voters for this round. Each of the eight semi-finalists had a solo performance with a guest performer(s). Similar to the first Live Performances round, the same two-round voting process occurred in this round. The contestant who received more performance money after two rounds of voting against their match-up advanced to the finals, while the loser got eliminated. In the event that all contestant(s) in one team lost in their respective match-up(s), their entire producer team was eliminated from the show.

 Indicates the winning performance and will advance to the final round.
 Eliminated from the show. If all contestant(s) in one team lost their respective match-ups, their entire producer team is eliminated as well from the show.

Round eight: final performances and special performances (live episode)
Due to the COVID-19 pandemic, this season's final round had pre-recorded performances, with a live announcement of performance results and season winner based on voting results from both the pre-finals online evaluation team (60% of the votes) and live SMS voters (40% of the votes). Prior to the final episode, the show's producers established a pre-finals online evaluation team where they selected people to serve as virtual audience members and voters for this round. They had a chance to watch and vote for the pre-recorded performances three hours before the final episode was aired. The four finalists also met up the night prior to the final round to determine their order of performances. The final round was divided into two parts: the first part of the finals featured all four finalists each having a solo performance with a special guest performer(s). After all four finalists performed, a two-round voting process from both the pre-finals online evaluation team and live SMS voting was held, and the performance ranking based on the pre-online votes was announced. In the second part of the finals, the four finalists each had one last performance with the producer(s) and/or with a special guest performer(s), with the same two-round voting process and announcement of performance ranking held after the final performances.  The contestant who earned the most cumulative performance money from both the pre-finals online evaluation team voters and live SMS voters in all two performances was the season's champion, receiving ₩100,000,000 in cash, a sports car, and the launch of a one-year project label for their music activities, totaling up to ₩500,000,000. The final episode also included special performances from eliminated contestants with their songs included in this season's official discography.

 Indicates winner
 Indicates the 1st runner-up
 Indicates the 2nd and 3rd runner-ups

Top 24

 WINNER  The contestant won Show Me the Money 9.
 Runner-Up  The contestant was the runner-up.
 2nd and 3rd Runner-Ups  The contestants were 2nd and 3rd Runner-Ups.
 ALL-PASS  The contestant received an All-Pass on both the first and second judging during the second round.
 ALL-PASS + FAIL  The contestant an All-Pass in the first judging but received at least 1 fail after the second judging during the second round.
 3 PASS  The contestant received 1 fails during the second round.
 3 PASS + FAIL  The contestant received 1 fail in the first judging, and at least 1 fail in the second judging during the second round.
 2 PASS  The contestant received two fails during the second round.
 2 PASS + FAIL  The contestant received 2 fails in the first judging, and at least 1 fail in the second judging during the second round.
 1 PASS  The contestant only received one pass during the second round.
 FAIL + PASS/FAIL  The contestant initially received an All-fail, Fail + Pass/Fail, or 4 All Pass/Fail scores in the second round, but was revived to join their respective producer team.
 ELIM  The contestant was eliminated (or in Owen's case, the contestant voluntarily left the show at the end of the round).
 WON  The contestant's crew won during the Triple Crew Battle.
 WON  The contestant's crew won during the Soundtrack Battle.
 WON  The contestant's producer team won the Team Diss Battle. 
 The contestant did not participate in this round.
WON/WON The contestant won their individual match-up, and their producer team won the team match-up during the 1st Live Performance Round. 
WON/LOST The contestant won their individual match-up, but their producer team lost the team match-up during the 1st Live Performance Round. 
LOST/WON The contestant lost their individual match-up, but their producer team won the team match-up during the 1st Live Performance Round. 
LOST/LOST The contestant lost their individual match-up, and their producer team lost the team match-up during the 1st Live Performance Round. 
Italicized - The contestant originally advanced and made it to the final Top 24, but voluntarily left the show.

==Controversies==
 Owen: In an official statement by MKIT RAIN on October 19, 2020, he, alongside 4 other MKIT RAIN artists, admitted to smoking marijuana in 2019. On October 20, it was announced that he has dropped out of the show. Due to this, Mnet decided to edit him out completely by blurring him starting from episodes 2 to 5, and in episode 6 it showed that he did not perform in the Soundtrack Battle, indicating that he dropped out of the show at this point. Mnet also announced that episode 1 of the show has been removed and re-edited.
 Lobonabeat!: On October 20, 2020, he had posted controversial Instagram stories regarding the legalisation of marijuana and criticised famous Korean rappers for not getting caught by the law for using marijuana. The Instagram stories were then later deleted. Although his a cappella rap was not aired, Mnet announced that he will be edited out of the show as a result of the now recently deleted Instagram stories and his past criminal record of selling illegal drugs.

Discography

Notes

References

2020 South Korean television seasons
Show Me the Money (South Korean TV series)